El Menzah Sport Palace is an indoor sports arena situated in El Menzah, a district in the north of Tunis. It is located in the heart of the Olympic City of El Menzah, near the Stade El Menzah.

History
Built on the occasion of the 1967 Mediterranean Games opened by president Habib Bourguiba, the arena was used primely for the volleyball competition. The 5,500-seat enclosure hosted matches of the 2005 World Men's Handball Championship as well as those of the African handball nations championships organized in Tunisia (1974, 1981, 1994, 2006).

The hall also hosts political meetings and music concerts, the first of which were those of Umm Kulthum in 1968.

The arena usually hosts volleyball, basketball, handball, judo, fencing, wrestling and other games and tournaments with high attendance. It will host several matches of the 2014 FIVB Volleyball World League.

Events

The arena hosted many events and competitions:
IHF World Men's Handball Championship: 2005
Men's African Volleyball Championship: 1967, 1976, 1987, 1995
Mediterranean Games: 1967, 2001
FIE Fencing World Cup: 2009-2010
FIBA Under-19 World Championship for Women: 2007
FIBA Africa Championship: 1987
African Men's Handball Championship: 1974, 1981, 1994, 2006

See also
List of indoor arenas in Tunisia

External links

El Menzah Sports Palace on the Google Maps

Indoor arenas in Tunisia
Buildings and structures completed in 1967
Volleyball in Tunisia
Volleyball venues in Tunisia
Basketball in Tunisia
Handball venues in Tunisia
Sports venues in Tunisia
Sport in Tunis
Sports venues completed in 1967
Basketball venues in Tunisia